The Süper Lig top scorers are called Gol Kralı (literally meaning "Goal King" in Turkish) in Turkey. It is the title earned by the top goalscorer in Turkish football league divisions.

The title is currently held by Umut Bozok, who scored 20 goals for Kasımpaşa in the 2020–21 season.
The highest number of goals scored is 39, by Tanju Çolak for Galatasaray in 1987–88. Metin Oktay (1962–63) and Hakan Şükür (1996–97) narrowly missed the record; they each scored 38 goals for Galatasaray. Oktay has won the award the most times with six wins in 1959, 1959–60, 1960–61, 1962–63, 1964–65 and 1968–69, which was also his last season. Bosnian Tarik Hodžić was the first non-Turkish winner, when he scored 16 goals for Galatasaray in the 1983–84 season. Oktay (1959, 1960, 1961), Çolak (1986, 1987, 1988) and Şükür (1997, 1998, 1999) are the only players to win the award in three consecutive seasons. Brazilian Alex de Souza is the only foreign player to become top scorer twice. He became top scorer with Fenerbahçe in the 2006–07 and 2010–11 seasons, also winning the Turkish championship title with his club on both occasions. Fenerbahçe are the only club in Süper Lig history to have brought forth the top scorer in four consecutive seasons, from 1991–92 to the 1994–95 season.

Çolak won the European Golden Shoe for his 39 for Galatasaray in 1987–88 and came second with 31 goals in 1990–91. In the 1962–63 season Oktay scored 38 for Galatasaray and became Europe's top scorer. Şükür came third in 1996–97, despite scoring the most goals in Europe.

All-time top scorers

Key
 Bold shows players still playing in Süper Lig.
 Italics show players still playing professional football in other leagues.

Top scorers by season 
The top scorers of the former Turkish Football Championship and National Division are not included in the following list:

Teams in bold are the champions of mentioned season.

Statistics

By player

By club

By country

Records
Most goals in a season: 39
 Tanju Çolak (Galatasaray) 1987–88
Highest scoring average: 1.461 Goals per match
 Metin Oktay (Galatasaray) 1962–63 (38 goals in 26 matches)
Most consecutive wins: 3
 Metin Oktay (1959, 1960, 1961)
 Tanju Çolak (1986, 1987, 1988)
 Hakan Şükür (1997, 1998, 1999)
Most consecutive club wins: 4
 Fenerbahçe (1992, 1993, 1994, 1995)

 Youngest topscorers:
 Tanju Çolak (1985–86, 22 years 203 days)
 Selçuk Yula (1981–82, 22 years 216 days)
 Okan Yılmaz (2000–01, 23 years 4 days)
 Metin Oktay (1959, 23 years 124 days)
 Oldest topscorers:
 Alex de Souza (2010–11, 33 years 250 days)
 Metin Oktay (1968–69, 33 years 112 days)
 Vágner Love (2016–17, 32 years 352 days)
 Bafétimbi Gomis (2017–18, 32 years 286 days)
 Ogün Altıparmak (1970–71, 32 years 208 days)
 Tarık Hodzic (1983–84, 32 years 177 days)

See also 
Capocannoniere
Premier League Golden Boot
Pichichi Trophy
List of Bundesliga top scorers
Bola de Prata (Portugal)
European Golden Shoe
List of Turkish football champions
Football records in Turkey

References

External links 
RSSSF Turkish top scorers 
Turkish Football Federation 

 
Turkey
Turkey
Association football player non-biographical articles